Bagshot is a village in the Surrey Heath borough of Surrey, England.

Bagshot may also refer to:

Places in England 
Bagshot, Wiltshire
Bagshot Heath
Bagshot Park, home of the Duke and Duchess of Edinburgh
Bagshot Rural District, now Surrey Heath, a local government district in Surrey

Other uses 
Bagshot F.C., Surrey, England
Bagshot Formation, an Eocene sedimentary rock formation
Bagshot Row, the residence of Bilbo Baggins and  Frodo Baggins in The Lord of the Rings
Bathilda Bagshot, a fictional character in the Harry Potter books
Bristol Bagshot, a British biplane fighter design
HMS Bagshot, a British Royal Navy minesweeper
Bagshot, Victoria, Australia
Bagshot North, Victoria, Australia

See also